Topos may refer to:

 Topos (plural topoi) – a type of category in mathematics
 Classifying topos – a topos that categorifies the models of a structure in another topos
 Effective topos – a topos that captures the idea of effectivity in mathematics
 Étale topos – the category of étale sheaves
 Rhetoric topos – topoi in rhetorical invention
 Literary topos – topoi in literary theory
 Los Topos – California theatre troupe
 Oo-Topos – interactive science-fiction game
 Topical logic – reasoning from commonplace topoi
 Topo (climbing) (plural topos) – description of a climbing route
 Topos de Reynosa FC – a Mexican football club
 Topos de Tlatelolco – a non-for-profit rescue organization based in Mexico
 Topos hyperuranionos – Platonic realm of archetypes
 Topos V – a sculpture by Eduardo Chillida, displayed in Barcelona

See also

 Toos (disambiguation)
 Topo (disambiguation)